International Max Planck Research School for Molecular Biology, also known as IMPRS for Molecular Biology, is a 1.5 years MSc program or a 4-year PhD program. The first year in both graduate tracks is the same and the students are studying together. The curriculum consists of intensive theoretical lectures covering all major fields of the molecular biosciences. Each lecture is followed by a tutorial for in-depth discussion of the topics covered. The practical education consists of 3 months of 2-day methods courses and three 2-month lab rotation projects. All practical work is done in different research laboratories in Göttingen.  After an examination at the end of the first year, based on the final grades  it is possible to continue towards a MSc or PhD, or PhD with integrated MSc degrees. There are about 20 students accepted each year selected on a highly competitive basis from applicants from all over the world. The IMPRS for Molecular Biology was one of the founding member members (along with the IMPRS for Neurosciences) and is part of the Göttingen Graduate School for Neurosciences and Molecular Biosciences (GGNB). Every year students from the graduate program are organizing the renowned international PhD symposium Horizons in Molecular Biology.

The IMPRS's home town is Göttingen and the participating institutions in this program are:
 Göttingen Center for Molecular Biosciences (GZMB) at the University of Göttingen 
 Max Planck Institute for Biophysical Chemistry (MPI-bpc)
 Max Planck Institute for Experimental Medicine (MPI-em)
 German Primate Center (DPZ) - Leibniz Institute 
 European Neuroscience Institute - Göttingen (ENI-G)

References

 IMPRS for Molecular Biology
 Horizons in Molecular Biology

Molecular biology institutes
Max Planck Society